Oktyabrsky is a rural locality (a settlement) and the administrative center of Dobrovolskoye Rural Settlement, Povorinsky District, Voronezh Oblast, Russia. The population was 698 as of 2010. There are 11 streets.

Geography 
Oktyabrsky is located 58 km northeast of Povorino (the district's administrative centre) by road. Mikhaylovka is the nearest rural locality.

References 

Rural localities in Povorinsky District